The Basketmaker III Era also called the "Modified Basketmaker" period, was the third period in which Ancient Pueblo People were cultivating food, began making pottery and living in more sophisticated clusters of pit-house dwellings.  Hunting was easier with the adoption of the bow and arrow.

The Basketmaker III Era is preceded by the Late Basketmaker II Era, and is followed by the Pueblo I Era.

Architecture
In the Basketmaker III Era people continued to live in pit-houses, but the architecture changed.  Now the houses were larger, included division on the space into sections, a large central hearth, addition of vestibules, and slabs of stone were used to line the walls.

Most pit-houses were built out in the open on tops of mesas. A log frame was built to support side walls and a roof that were covered with woven reeds, grass and, lastly, mud for weatherproofing. In the center of a roof was an opening used for ventilation and an entrance to the dwelling. Some pit-houses had an attached storage room.<ref name=MV-APC>[http://www.nps.gov/meve/forteachers/upload/ep_activity3_chronology.pdf Ancestral Puebloan Chronology (teaching aid).] Mesa Verde National Park, National Park Service. Retrieved 10-16-2011.</ref>

Communities
thumb|Map of Ancient Pueblo People in the American Southwest and Mexico.
thumb|Example of a pit-house 
Mesa Verde.  Small groupings of pit houses were built on the top of mesas.

Chaco Canyon. From about  more than 200 Basketmaker sites sat on Chaco Canyon mesas, ridges, and the canyon floor.  The sites had clusters of 1–20 pit-houses. One of its villages, Shabik'eschee, was the type site for this period.  Although most village sites were  relatively small during this period, Shabik'eschee (about ) contained 18 pit-houses for an estimated 77 people, more than 50 storage pits, and a large pit-house used for celebration and rituals.  This compares to an average settlement for 5 to 15 people.  The large pit-house was likely a "great" kiva.  Based on the number of extra pit-houses for storage, it is possible that the village was visited from nearby settlers.

Pleasant View, Colorado. There may have been pressure within the Basketmaker III communities to ensure their safety.  Stockades encircled pit-houses in at least 11 sites within a 10 miles of Pleasant View, Colorado. The settlements (dated from ) could have been fenced to ensure safety of children or contain domesticated dogs and turkeys.  It is considered is more likely that they were built as a defensive measure, based upon extensive collections of burnt artifacts from the sites.  A theory is that other local people may have waged war having felt displaced by the number of new Basketmaker III settlements in the area.

Culture and religion
During this period the social and political structure was likely informal, with heads of households making decisions by consensus.

Petroglyphs of people and animals were made in the Petrified Forest National Park during this period.

Agriculture
Beans, squash and maize were cultivated in this period.  The farm also include the raising of turkeys, both for feathers and a source of food.  Food was kept in storage cists, below ground pits that were lined and covered with stone.  People also hunted, trapped and gathered wild nuts, plants and fruit.

Pottery
In the Basketmaker III era pottery was introduced which reduced the number of baskets that they made and eliminated the creation of woven bags.  Simple, gray pottery was a more effective vessel for cooking, storage and carrying water.  The people in the area of the Petrified Forest National Park made Adamana Brown pottery, considered the earliest pottery on the Colorado Plateau.It's Not Rocket Science Contributions to the Archeology of Petrified Forest National Park in Honor of Bob Cooper. tDAR – The Digital Archaeological Record, Digital Antiquity. 2010. Retrieved 10-16-2011.

Material goods
The Basketmaker people's skill at making baskets and weaving improves during this period.  Part of their output includes bags, baskets, sandals, sashes and other woven items.  Pitch-lined baskets held water where food was cooked by placing hot stones in a water-filled basket. Bows and arrows made hunting easier and thus the acquisition of hides for clothing.  Spears and darts continued to be used, but with less regularity. Turkey feathers were woven into blankets and robes.  Babies were carried in soft, non-deforming cradle boards.

Other common material goods of the time were:
 Yucca woven sandals and rope
 Stone axes, knives and other tools used to pound, scrape and cut.
 Stone metates and manos to grind corn
 Bones stitching awls and scrapers
 Nets and snares to trap small game
 Sticks for digging to plant seeds
 Cradleboards made from yucca, twigs and rabbit fur

Cultural groups and periods
The cultural groups of this period include:
 Ancestral Puebloans – southern Utah, southern Colorado, northern Arizona and northern and central New Mexico.
 Hohokam – southern Arizona.
 Mogollon – southeastern Arizona, southern New Mexico and northern Mexico.
 Patayan – western Arizona, California and Baja California.

Notable Basketmaker III sites
 Chaco Culture National Historical Park – New Mexico
 Darkmold Site – Colorado
 Durango Rock Shelters Archeology Site – Colorado (Basketmaker II type site)
 Grand Staircase–Escalante National Monument – Utah
 Grand Canyon area – Arizona
 Hovenweep National Monument – Colorado
 Kanab Creek area – Utah and Arizona
 Mesa Verde National Park – Colorado
 Petrified Forest National Park – Arizona
 Spring Creek Archeological District – Colorado
 Talus Village – Colorado
 Virgin Anasazi – Colorado Plateau of Nevada, Utah and Arizona

 References 

Further reading
 Reed, Paul F. (2000) Foundations of Anasazi Culture: The Basketmaker Pueblo Transition. University of Utah Press. .
 Stuart, David E.; Moczygemba-McKinsey, Susan B. (2000) Anasazi America: Seventeen Centuries on the Road from Center Place.'' University of New Mexico Press. .

Modifications 
In the 'Basketmaker III era' also known as the 'Modified basketmaker era' the Anasazi people started making some modifications to improve their everyday life. They started realizing a greater importance of agriculture and started domestication of turkeys and start growing new crops such as beans. the Basketmaker III era is known for these improvements and their pottery getting more complex.

Sources
 

Native American history of Arizona
Native American history of Colorado
Native American history of Nevada
Native American history of New Mexico
Native American history of Utah
Archaic period in North America
Oasisamerica cultures
Pueblo history
Southwest periods in North America by Pecos classification